The Rugby League World Cup is an international rugby league competition established in 1954. The tournament has taken place fifteen times in irregular intervals, however the tournament is currently happening every four years.

The opening match is the first match of the tournament and usually it has a ceremony to go with it. Often, it features the host nation.

List of opening matches 
Italics denotes host nation.

References 

Opening matches
World Cup opening matches